Rohtez (Danish and Tagalog pronunciation: Roohtez) is a Danish / Filipino middle name, literally meaning " red." It is not a common surname, shared by only a few people. It is of similar origin to the German word "rot," meaning "red."

Notable personalities with the surname Rohtez
Kenneth Rohtez Pedersen (born 1969) was a Danish Council Politician 2002 - 2007 in Højreby  municipality on the island of Lolland in south Denmark / Bachelor of Agricultural and Environmental Management

References

See also
Pedersen

Danish-language surnames